

Events

Pre-1600
 683 – Yazid I's army kills 11,000 people of Medina including notable Sahabas in Battle of al-Harrah. 
1071 – The Seljuq Turks defeat the Byzantine army at the Battle of Manzikert, and soon gain control of most of Anatolia.
1278 – Ladislaus IV of Hungary and Rudolf I of Germany defeat Ottokar II of Bohemia in the Battle on the Marchfeld near Dürnkrut in (then) Moravia.
1303 – Chittorgarh falls to the Delhi Sultanate.
1346 – At the Battle of Crécy, an English army easily defeats a French one twice its size.
1444 – Battle of St. Jakob an der Birs: A vastly outnumbered force of Swiss Confederates is defeated by the Dauphin Louis (future Louis XI of France) and his army of 'Armagnacs' near Basel.
1542 – Francisco de Orellana crosses South America from Guayaquil on the Pacific coast to the mouth of the Amazon River on the Atlantic coast.

1601–1900
1642 – Dutch–Portuguese War: Second Battle of San Salvador: The Dutch force the Spanish garrison at San Salvador (modern day Keelung, Taiwan) to surrender, ending the short-lived Spanish colony on Formosa and replacing it with a new Dutch administration.
1648 – The Fronde: First Fronde: In the wake of the successful Battle of Lens, Cardinal Mazarin, Chief Minister of France, suddenly orders the arrest of the leaders of the Parlement of Paris, provoking the rest of Paris to break into insurrection and barricade the streets the next day. 
1748 – The first Lutheran denomination in North America, the Pennsylvania Ministerium, is founded in Philadelphia.
1767 – Jesuits all over Chile are arrested as the Spanish Empire suppresses the Society of Jesus.
1768 – Captain James Cook sets sail from England on board .
1778 – The first recorded ascent of Triglav, the highest mountain in Slovenia.
1789 – The Declaration of the Rights of Man and of the Citizen is approved by the National Constituent Assembly of France.
1791 – John Fitch is granted a United States patent for the steamboat.
1810 – The former viceroy Santiago de Liniers of the Viceroyalty of the Río de la Plata is executed after the defeat of his counter-revolution.
1813 – War of the Sixth Coalition: An impromptu battle takes place when French and Prussian-Russian forces accidentally run into each other near Liegnitz, Prussia (now Legnica, Poland).
1814 – Chilean War of Independence: Infighting between the rebel forces of José Miguel Carrera and Bernardo O'Higgins erupts in the Battle of Las Tres Acequias.
1833 – The great 1833 Kathmandu–Bihar earthquake causes major damage in Nepal, northern India and Tibet, a total of 500 people perish.  
1849 – President Faustin Soulouque of the First Republic of Haiti has the Senate and Chamber of Deputies proclaim him the Emperor of Haiti, abolishing the Republic and inaugurating the Second Empire of Haiti.
1863 – The Swedish-language liberal newspaper Helsingfors Dagblad proposed the current blue-and-white cross flag as the flag of Finland.
1883 – The 1883 eruption of Krakatoa begins its final, paroxysmal, stage.

1901–present
1914 – World War I: The German colony of Togoland surrenders to French and British forces after a 20-day campaign.
  1914   – World War I: During the retreat from Mons, the British II Corps commanded by General Sir Horace Smith-Dorrien fights a vigorous and successful defensive action at Le Cateau.
1920 – The 19th amendment to United States Constitution takes effect, giving women the right to vote.
1922 – Greco-Turkish War (1919–22): Turkish army launched what has come to be known to the Turks as the Great Offensive (Büyük Taarruz). The major Greek defense positions were overrun.
1936 – Spanish Civil War: Santander falls to the nationalists and the republican interprovincial council is dissolved.
1940 – World War II: Chad becomes the first French colony to join the Allies under the administration of Félix Éboué, France's first black colonial governor.
1942 – The Holocaust in Ukraine: At Chortkiv, the Ukrainian police and German Schutzpolizei deport two thousand Jews to Bełżec extermination camp. Five hundred of the sick and children are murdered on the spot. This continued until the next day.
1944 – World War II: Charles de Gaulle enters Paris.
1966 – The South African Border War starts with the battle at Omugulugwombashe.
1970 – The fiftieth anniversary of American women being able to vote is marked by a nationwide Women's Strike for Equality.
1972 – The Games of the XX Olympiad open in Munich, West Germany.
1977 – The Charter of the French Language is adopted by the National Assembly of Quebec.
1978 – Papal conclave: Albino Luciani is elected as Pope John Paul I.
1980 – After John Birges plants a bomb at Harvey's Resort Hotel in Stateline, Nevada, in the United States, the FBI inadvertently detonates the bomb during its disarming.
1997 – Beni Ali massacre occurs in Algeria, leaving 60 to 100 people dead.
1998 – The first flight of the Boeing Delta III ends in disaster 75 seconds after liftoff resulting in the loss of the Galaxy X  communications satellite.
1999 – Russia begins the Second Chechen War in response to the Invasion of Dagestan by the Islamic International Peacekeeping Brigade.
2003 – A Beechcraft 1900 operating as Colgan Air Flight 9446 crashes after taking off from Barnstable Municipal Airport in Yarmouth, Massachusetts, killing both pilots on board.
2009 – Kidnapping victim Jaycee Dugard is discovered alive in California after being missing for over 18 years. Her captors, Phillip and Nancy Garrido are apprehended.
2011 – The Boeing 787 Dreamliner, Boeing's all-new composite airliner, receives certification from the EASA and the FAA.
2014 – The Jay Report into the Rotherham child sexual exploitation scandal is published.
2015 – Two U.S. journalists are shot and killed by a disgruntled former coworker while conducting a live report in Moneta, Virginia.
2018 – Three people are killed and eleven wounded during a mass shooting at a Madden NFL '19 video game tournament in Jacksonville, Florida.
2021 – During the 2021 Kabul airlift, a suicide bombing at Hamid Karzai International Airport kills 13 US military personnel and at least 169 Afghan civilians.

Births

Pre-1600
1469 – Ferdinand II of Naples (d. 1496)
1548 – Bernardino Poccetti, Italian painter (d. 1612)
1582 – Humilis of Bisignano, Italian Franciscan friar and saint (d. 1637)
1596 – Frederick V, Elector Palatine, Bohemian king (d. 1632)

1601–1900
1676 – Robert Walpole, English politician, Prime Minister of the United Kingdom (d. 1745)
1694 – Elisha Williams, English colonial minister, academic, and politician (d. 1755)
1695 – Marie-Anne-Catherine Quinault, French singer-songwriter (d. 1791)
1728 – Johann Heinrich Lambert, Swiss mathematician, physicist, and astronomer (d. 1777)
1736 – Jean-Baptiste L. Romé de l'Isle, French mineralogist and geologist (d. 1790)
1740 – Joseph-Michel Montgolfier, French inventor, invented the hot air balloon (d. 1810)
1743 – Antoine Lavoisier, French chemist and biologist (d. 1794)
1751 – Manuel Abad y Queipo, Spanish-born Mexican bishop (d. 1825)
1775 – William Joseph Behr, German publicist and academic (d. 1851)
1783 – Federigo Zuccari, astronomer, director of the Astronomical Observatory of Naples (d. 1817)
1792 – Manuel Oribe, Uruguayan soldier and politician, 4th President of Uruguay (d. 1857)
1797 – Saint Innocent of Alaska, Russian Orthodox missionary priest, then the first Orthodox bishop and archbishop in the Americas, and finally the Metropolitan of Moscow and all Russia (d. 1879)
1819 – Albert, Prince Consort of the United Kingdom (d. 1861)
1824 – Martha Darley Mutrie, British painter (d. 1885)
1854 – Arnold Fothergill, English cricketer (d. 1932)
1856 – Clara Schønfeld, Danish actress (d. 1939)
1862 – Herbert Booth, Canadian songwriter and bandleader (d. 1926)
1865 – Arthur James Arnot, Scottish-Australian engineer, designed the Spencer Street Power Station (d. 1946)
1873 – Lee de Forest, American engineer and academic, invented the Audion tube (d. 1961)
1874 – Zona Gale, American novelist, short story writer, and playwright (d. 1938)
1875 – John Buchan, 1st Baron Tweedsmuir, Scottish-Canadian historian and politician, 15th Governor General of Canada (d. 1940)
1880 – Guillaume Apollinaire, Italian-French author, poet, playwright, and critic (d. 1918)
1882 – James Franck, German physicist and academic, Nobel Prize laureate (d. 1964)
  1882   – Sam Hardy, English footballer (d. 1966)
1885 – Jules Romains, French author and poet (d. 1972)
1888 – Gustavo R. Vincenti, Maltese architect and developer (d. 1974)
1891 – Acharya Chatursen Shastri, Indian author and playwright (d. 1960)
1894 – Sparky Adams, American baseball player and farmer (d. 1989)
1896 – Ivan Mihailov, Bulgarian soldier and politician (d. 1990)
1897 – Yun Posun, South Korean activist and politician, 2nd President of South Korea (d. 1990)
1898 – Peggy Guggenheim, American-Italian art collector and philanthropist (d. 1979)
1900 – Margaret Utinsky, American nurse, recipient of the Medal of Freedom (d. 1970)
  1900   – Hellmuth Walter, German-American engineer and businessman (d. 1980)

1901–present
1901 – Eleanor Dark, Australian author and poet (d. 1985)
  1901   – Hans Kammler, German SS officer and engineer (d. 1945)
  1901   – Jimmy Rushing, American singer and bandleader (d. 1972)
  1901   – Maxwell D. Taylor, American general and diplomat, United States Ambassador to South Vietnam (d. 1987)
  1901   – Chen Yi, Chinese general and politician, 2nd Foreign Minister of the People's Republic of China (d. 1972)
1903 – Caroline Pafford Miller, American author (d. 1992)
1904 – Christopher Isherwood, English-American author and academic (d. 1986)
  1904   – Joe Hulme, English footballer and cricketer (d. 1991)
1906 – Bunny Austin, English tennis player (d. 2000)
  1906   – Albert Sabin, Polish-American physician and virologist, developed the polio vaccine (d. 1993)
1908 – Walter Bruno Henning, Prussian-American linguist and scholar (d. 1967)
  1908   – Aubrey Schenck, American screenwriter and producer (d. 1999)
1909 – Eric Davies, South African cricketer and educator (d. 1976)
  1909   – Jim Davis, American actor (d. 1981)
  1909   – Gene Moore, American baseball player (d. 1978)
1910 – Mother Teresa, Albanian-Indian nun, missionary, Catholic saint, and Nobel Prize laureate (d. 1997)
1911 – Otto Binder, American author and screenwriter (d. 1974)
1914 – Julio Cortázar, Belgian-Argentinian author and translator (d. 1984)
  1914   – Fazıl Hüsnü Dağlarca, Turkish soldier and poet (d. 2008)
1915 – Humphrey Searle, English composer and conductor (d. 1982)
1918 – Katherine Johnson, American physicist and mathematician (d. 2020)
1919 – Gerard Campbell, American priest and academic (d. 2012)
1920 – Brant Parker, American illustrator (d. 2007)
  1920   – Prem Tinsulanonda, Thai general and politician, 16th Prime Minister of Thailand (d. 2019)
1921 – Shimshon Amitsur, Israeli mathematician and scholar (d. 1994)
  1921   – Benjamin C. Bradlee, American journalist and author (d. 2014) 
1922 – Irving R. Levine, American journalist and author (d. 2009)
1923 – Wolfgang Sawallisch, German pianist and conductor (d. 2013)
1924 – Alex Kellner, American baseball player (d. 1996)
1925 – Jack Hirshleifer, American economist and academic (d. 2005)
  1925   – Alain Peyrefitte, French scholar and politician, Minister of Justice for France (d. 1999)
  1925   – Pyotr Todorovsky, Ukrainian-Russian director, screenwriter, and cinematographer (d. 2013)
  1925   – Etelka Keserű, Hungarian economist and politician (d. 2018)
  1925   – Gustavo Becerra-Schmidt, Chilean composer (d. 2010)
1926 – Anahit Tsitsikian, Armenian violinist and educator (d. 1999)
  1926   – Robert Vickrey, American painter and author (d. 2011)
1928 – Om Prakash Munjal, Indian businessman and philanthropist, co-founded Hero Cycles (d. 2015)
1929 – Reuben Kamanga, Zambian soldier and politician, 1st Vice President of Zambia (d. 1996)
1930 – Joe Solomon, Guyanese cricketer and coach
1931 – Kálmán Markovits, Hungarian water polo player (d. 2009)
1932 – Luis Salvadores Salvi, Chilean basketball player (d. 2014)
1934 – Tom Heinsohn, American basketball player, coach, and sportscaster (d. 2020) 
  1934   – Kevin Ryan, Australian rugby player, coach, lawyer and politician
1935 – Geraldine Ferraro, American lawyer and politician (d. 2011)
  1935   – Karen Spärck Jones, English computer scientist and academic (d. 2007)
1936 – Benedict Anderson, American political scientist and academic (d. 2015)
1937 – Don Bowman, American singer-songwriter (d. 2013)
1938 – Jet Black, English drummer (d. 2022)
1939 – Pinchas Goldstein, Israeli businessman and politician (d. 2007)
  1939   – Jorge Paulo Lemann, Brazilian banker and financier 
1940 – Michael Cockerell, English journalist
  1940   – Vic Dana, American dancer and singer
  1940   – Don LaFontaine, American voice actor, producer, and screenwriter (d. 2008)
  1940   – Nik Turner, English musician and songwriter (d. 2022)
1941 – Chris Curtis, English drummer and singer (d. 2005)
  1941   – Jane Merrow, English actress, producer, and screenwriter
  1941   – Barbet Schroeder, French-Swiss director and producer
1942 – Dennis Turner, Baron Bilston, English lawyer and politician (d. 2014)
  1942   – Chow Kwai Lam, Malaysian football coach and player (d. 2018)
1943 – Dori Caymmi, Brazilian singer-songwriter and guitarist
1944 – Alan Parker, English guitarist and songwriter 
  1944   – Judith Rees, English geographer and academic
  1944   – Maureen Tucker, American singer-songwriter and drummer 
1945 – Tom Ridge, American sergeant and politician, 1st Secretary of Homeland Security
1946 – Zhou Ji, Chinese engineer and politician, 14th Chinese Minister of Education
  1946   – Valerie Simpson, American singer-songwriter 
  1946   – Alison Steadman, English actress 
1947 – Nicolae Dobrin, Romanian footballer and manager (d. 2007)
1949 – Allahshukur Pashazadeh, Azerbaijani cleric
  1949   – Leon Redbone, Canadian-American singer-songwriter, guitarist, and producer (d. 2019)
1951 – Gerd Bonk, German weightlifter (d. 2014)
  1951   – Bill Whitaker, American journalist
  1951   – Edward Witten, American physicist and academic
1952 – Bryon Baltimore, Canadian ice hockey player
  1952   – Michael Jeter, American actor (d. 2003)
  1952   – Will Shortz, American journalist and puzzle creator
1953 – David Hurley, Australian general and politician, 27th Governor General of Australia
  1953   – Pat Sharkey, Irish footballer
1954 – Howard Clark, English golfer and sportscaster
  1954   – Tracy Krohn, American race car driver and businessman
  1954   – Hugh Pelham, British academic and educator 
1955 – Ian Dejardin, English historian and curator
  1955   – Giuseppe Resnati, Italian chemist and educator
1956 – Sally Beamish, English viola player and composer
  1956   – Brett Cullen, American actor
  1956   – Mark Mangino, American football player and coach
1957 – Nikky Finney, American poet and academic
1958 – Jan Nevens, Belgian cyclist
1959 – Oliver Colvile, English lawyer and politician
  1959   – Stan Van Gundy, American basketball player and coach
1960 – Branford Marsalis, American saxophonist, composer, and bandleader 
  1960   – Ola Ray, American model and actress
1961 – Daniel Lévi, Algerian-French singer-songwriter and pianist (d. 2022)
  1961   – Jeff Parrett, American baseball player
1962 – Roger Kingdom, American hurdler
1963 – David Byas, English cricketer and umpire
  1963   – Stephen J. Dubner, American journalist and author
  1963   – Patrice Oppliger, American author, critic, and academic
1964 – Allegra Huston, English-American author and screenwriter
  1964   – Bobby Jurasin, American-Canadian football player and coach
  1964   – Chad Kreuter, American baseball player and manager
  1964   – Zadok Malka, Israeli footballer and manager
  1964   – Torsten Schmitz, German boxer
  1964   – Carsten Wolf, German cyclist
  1964   – Mehriban Aliyeva, 1st Vice President of Azerbaijan, goodwill ambassador of UNESCO and ISESCO.
1965 – Marcus du Sautoy, English mathematician and academic
  1965   – Chris Burke, American actor
1966 – Jacques Brinkman, Dutch field hockey player and coach
  1966   – Shirley Manson, Scottish singer-songwriter and actress
1967 – Michael Gove, Scottish journalist and politician, Secretary of State for Education
1968 – Chris Boardman, English cyclist
1969 – Adrian Young, American drummer and songwriter
1970 – Jason Little, Australian rugby player
  1970   – Melissa McCarthy, American actress, comedian, producer, and screenwriter
  1970   – Brett Schultz, South African cricketer
1971 – Thalía, Mexican-American singer-songwriter and actress 
1973 – Richard Evatt, English boxer (d. 2012)
1974 – Kelvin Cato, American basketball player and coach
  1974   – Meredith Eaton, American actress
1975 – Morgan Ensberg, American baseball player and coach
1976 – Mike Colter, American actor
  1976   – Amaia Montero, Spanish singer-songwriter
1977 – Therese Alshammar, Swedish swimmer
  1977   – Liam Botham, English rugby player and cricketer
  1977   – Saeko Chiba, Japanese voice actress and singer
  1977   – Simone Motta, Italian footballer
1979 – Jamal Lewis, American football player
  1979   – Cristian Mora, Ecuadorian footballer
  1979   – Rubén Arriaza Pazos, Spanish footballer
1980 – Macaulay Culkin, American actor
  1980   – Brendan Harris, American baseball player
  1980   – Manolis Papamakarios, Greek basketball player
  1980   – Chris Pine, American actor
1981 – Tino Best, Barbadian cricketer
  1981   – Sebastian Bönig, German footballer
  1981   – Andreas Glyniadakis, Greek basketball player
  1981   – Vangelis Moras, Greek footballer
  1981   – Petey Williams, Canadian wrestler
1982 – Angelo Iorio, Italian footballer
  1982   – John Mulaney, American comedian, actor, writer, and producer
  1982   – Jayson Nix, American baseball player
  1982   – Noah Welch, American ice hockey player
1983 – Mattia Cassani, Italian footballer
  1983   – Félix Porteiro, Spanish race car driver
  1983   – Nicol David, Malaysian squash player
1985 – Oleksiy Kasyanov, Ukrainian decathlete
  1985   – Brandon McDonald, American football player
  1985   – David Price, American baseball player
1986 – Vladislav Gussev, Estonian footballer
  1986   – Colin Kazim-Richards, Turkish footballer
  1986   – Cassie Ventura, American singer, dancer, actress and model
1987 – Juan Joseph, American football player and coach (d. 2014)
1988 – Elvis Andrus, Venezuelan baseball player
  1988   – Evan Ross, American actor
  1988   – Danielle Savre, American actress
  1988   – Wayne Simmonds, Canadian ice hockey player
  1988   – Lars Stindl, German football player
1989 – James Harden, American basketball player
1990 – Lorenzo Brown, American basketball player
  1990   – Irina-Camelia Begu, Romanian tennis player
  1990    – Mateo Musacchio, Argentinian footballer
1991 – Jessie Diggins, American cross-country skier
1999 – Kotoshoho Yoshinari, Japanese sumo wrestler

Deaths

Pre-1600
787 – Arechis II, duke of Benevento
 887 – Kōkō, emperor of Japan (b. 830)
1214 – Michael IV of Constantinople
1278 – Ottokar II of Bohemia (b. 1233)
1346 – Charles II, Count of Alençon (b. 1297)
  1346   – Louis I, Count of Flanders (b. 1304)
  1346   – Louis II, Count of Blois
  1346   – Rudolph, Duke of Lorraine (b. 1320)
  1346   – John of Bohemia (b. 1296)
1349 – Thomas Bradwardine, English archbishop, mathematician, and physicist (b. 1290)
1399 – Mikhail II, Grand Prince of Tver (b. 1333)
1462 – Catherine Zaccaria, Despotess of the Morea
1486 – Ernest, Elector of Saxony (b. 1441)
1500 – Philipp I, Count of Hanau-Münzenberg (b. 1449)
1551 – Margaret Leijonhufvud, queen of Gustav I of Sweden (b. 1516)
1572 – Petrus Ramus, French philosopher and logician (b. 1515)
1595 – António, Prior of Crato (b. 1531)

1601–1900
1666 – Frans Hals, Dutch painter and educator (b. 1580)
1714 – Constantin Brâncoveanu, Ruler of Wallachia (b. 1654)
  1714   – Edward Fowler, English bishop and author (b. 1632)
1723 – Antonie van Leeuwenhoek, Dutch microscopist and biologist (b. 1632)
1785 – George Germain, 1st Viscount Sackville, English soldier and politician, 3rd Secretary of State for the Colonies (b. 1716)
1810 – Santiago de Liniers, 1st Count of Buenos Aires, French-Spanish sailor and politician, 10th Viceroyalty of the Río de la Plata (b. 1753)
1813 – Theodor Körner, German soldier and author (b. 1791)
1850 – Louis Philippe I of France (b. 1773)
1865 – Johann Franz Encke, German astronomer and academic (b. 1791)
1878 – Mariam Baouardy, Syrian Roman Catholic nun; later canonized (b. 1846)

1901–present
1910 – William James, American psychologist and philosopher (b. 1842)
1921 – Matthias Erzberger, German publicist and politician (b. 1875) 
  1921   – Sándor Wekerle, Hungarian jurist and politician, Prime Minister of Hungary (b. 1848)
  1921   – Petro Petrenko, Ukrainian anarchist military commander (b. 1890)
1930 – Lon Chaney, American actor, director, and screenwriter (b. 1883)
1943 – Bîmen Şen, Turkish composer and songwriter (b. 1873)
1944 – Adam von Trott zu Solz, German lawyer and diplomat (b. 1909)
1945 – Franz Werfel, Austrian author and playwright (b. 1890)
1946 – Jeanie MacPherson, American actress and screenwriter (b. 1887)
1956 – Alfred Wagenknecht, German-American activist (b. 1881)
1958 – Ralph Vaughan Williams, English composer and educator (b. 1872)
1966 – W. W. E. Ross, Canadian geophysicist and poet (b. 1894)
1968 – Kay Francis, American actress (b. 1905)
1972 – Francis Chichester, English pilot and sailor (b. 1901)
1974 – Charles Lindbergh, American pilot and explorer (b. 1902)
1975 – Olaf Holtedahl, Norwegian geologist and academic (b. 1885)
1976 – Lotte Lehmann, German-American soprano (b. 1888)
1977 – H. A. Rey, German-American author and illustrator, created Curious George (b. 1898)
1978 – Charles Boyer, French-American actor, singer, and producer (b. 1899)
  1978   – José Manuel Moreno, Argentinian footballer and manager (b. 1916)
1979 – Mika Waltari, Finnish author, translator, and academic (b. 1908)
1980 – Rosa Albach-Retty, German-Austrian actress (b. 1874)
  1980   – Tex Avery, American animator, director, and voice actor (b. 1908)
1981 – Roger Nash Baldwin, American trade union leader, co-founded the American Civil Liberties Union (b. 1884)
  1981   – Lee Hays, American singer-songwriter (b. 1914)
1986 – Ted Knight, American actor (b. 1923)
1987 – John Goddard, Barbadian-English cricketer and manager (b. 1919)
  1987   – Georg Wittig, German chemist and academic, Nobel Prize laureate (b. 1897)
1988 – Carlos Paião, Portuguese singer-songwriter (b. 1957)
1989 – Irving Stone, American author (b. 1903)
1990 – Tang Chang, Thai artist (b. 1934)
1991 – Mildred Albert, American fashion commentator, TV and radio personality, and fashion show producer (b. 1905)
1992 – Bob de Moor, Belgian author and illustrator (b. 1925)
1993 – Reima Pietilä, Finnish architect, co-designed the Kaleva Church (b. 1923)
1995 – John Brunner, English-Scottish author and poet (b. 1934)
1998 – Frederick Reines, American physicist, Nobel Prize laureate (b. 1918)
2000 – Akbar Adibi, Iranian engineer and academic (b. 1939)
  2000   – Bunny Austin, English tennis player (b. 1906)
2001 – Louis Muhlstock, Polish-Canadian painter and educator (b. 1904)
  2001   – Marita Petersen, Faroese educator and politician, 8th Prime Minister of the Faroe Islands (b. 1940)
2003 – Jim Wacker, American football player and coach (b. 1937)
2004 – Laura Branigan, American singer-songwriter and actress (b. 1952)
2005 – Denis D'Amour, Canadian guitarist and songwriter  (b. 1960)
  2005   – Robert Denning, American art collector and interior designer (b. 1927)
  2005   – Moondog King, Canadian wrestler and politician (b. 1949)
2006 – Rainer Barzel, Polish-German lawyer and politician, Minister of Intra-German Relations (b. 1924)
  2006   – Clyde Walcott, Barbadian cricketer and coach (b. 1926)
  2006   – William Garnett, American landscape photographer (b. 1916)
2007 – Gaston Thorn, Luxembourger jurist and politician, 20th Prime Minister of Luxembourg (b. 1928)
2009 – Dominick Dunne, American journalist and novelist (b. 1925)
2010 – Raimon Panikkar, Catalan priest and scholar (b. 1918)
2011 – George Band, Taiwanese-English mountaineer and author (b. 1929)
  2011   – Patrick C. Fischer, American computer scientist and academic (b. 1935)
  2011   – John McAleese, Scottish sergeant (b. 1949)
2012 – Russ Alben, American composer and businessman (b. 1929)
  2012   – Reginald Bartholomew, American academic and diplomat, United States Ambassador to Italy (b. 1936)
  2012   – Jacques Bensimon, Canadian director and producer (b. 1943)
  2012   – Krzysztof Wilmanski, Polish-German physicist and academic (b. 1940)
2013 – Hélie de Saint Marc, French soldier (b. 1922)
  2013   – John J. Gilligan, American soldier and politician, 62nd Governor of Ohio (b. 1921)
  2013   – Bill Schmitz, American football player and coach (b. 1954)
  2013   – Jack Sinagra, American lawyer and politician (b. 1950)
  2013   – Clyde A. Wheeler, American soldier and politician (b. 1921)
2014 – Christian Bourquin, French lawyer and politician (b. 1954)
  2014   – Peter Bacon Hales, American historian, photographer, and author (b. 1950)
  2014   – Caroline Kellett, English journalist (b. 1960)
  2014   – Chūsei Sone, Japanese director, producer, and screenwriter (b. 1937)
2015 – Amelia Boynton Robinson, American activist (b. 1911)
  2015   – Donald Eric Capps, American theologian, author, and academic (b. 1939)
  2015   – P. J. Kavanagh, English poet and author (b. 1931)
  2015   – Stefanos Manikas, Greek politician (b. 1952)
  2015   – Francisco San Diego, Filipino bishop (b. 1935)
2017 – Tobe Hooper, American film director (b. 1943)
2018 – Neil Simon, American playwright and author (b. 1927)
2020 – Joe Ruby, American animator (b. 1933)

Holidays and observances
 Christian feast day:
 Adrian and Natalia of Nicomedia (Eastern Orthodox Church)
 Alexander of Bergamo (Roman Catholic Church)
 Blessed Ceferino Namuncurá
 David Lewis
 Jeanne-Elisabeth Bichier des Ages
 Mariam Baouardy (Melkite Greek Catholic Church)
 Melchizedek
 Our Lady of Częstochowa
 Simplicius, Constantius and Victorinus
 Teresa Jornet Ibars
 Zephyrinus
 August 26 (Eastern Orthodox liturgics)
 Herero Day (Namibia)
 Heroes' Day (Namibia)
 Repentance Day (Papua New Guinea)
 Women's Equality Day (United States)

References

External links

 
 
 

Days of the year
August